Char Dil Char Rahen (English title: Four Hearts, Four Roads) is a 1959 Hindi film directed by Khwaja Ahmad Abbas, and starring two big stars of the era, real-life brothers Shammi Kapoor and Raj Kapoor. The movie is based on a novel of the same name.

Plot
Three young man Govinda (Raj Kapoor), Dilwar (Ajit Khan) and Jhonny (Shammi Kapoor) waiting at the crossroads for their lovers. Govinda was prevented from marrying Chavi (Meena Kumari) as she is untouchable and driven out from village. Govinda then waits for her at the crossroads. Dilwar rescues Pyari (Nimmi) from Nawab (Anwar Hussain (actor)) but she refuses to escape without her mother. She then sets up a shop and waits near crossroad for Dilawar. Jhonny in love with Stella (Kumkum (actress)) is framed by his boss Fereira (David Abraham) and jailed he later joins group of crossroads and starts a garage. Nirmal Kumar (Paidi Jairaj) the union leader then asks the trio to blast a hill at crossroad to build a road.

Cast
 Raj Kapoor as Govinda
 Ajit as Dilawar
 Shammi Kapoor as Johny Braganza
 Meena Kumari as Chavli
 Kumkum as Stella D'Souza
 Nimmi as Pyari
 Anwar Hussain as Nawab Saab
 David Abraham as Ferreira
 Nana Palsikar as Pujariji
 Achala Sachdev
 P. Jairaj as Nirmal Kumar
 Rashid Khan
 Kumari Naaz (as Baby Naaz)

Soundtrack

Box office
It was released simultaneously with other big films,  Devendra Goel's Chirag Kahan Roshni Kahan and V Shantaram's Navrang, while Navrang was a hit, Chirag Kahan Roshni Kahan broke even and Char Dil Char Rahen failed at the Indian box office in 1959.

However, it later went on to become an overseas blockbuster at the Soviet box office, where it drew 39.8 million viewers in 1962. In the Soviet Union, the film grossed 9.95 million Rbls (US$11.06 million, 5.27 crore), equivalent to US$ million (591 crore) in 2016. Its overseas Soviet gross exceeded the domestic Indian gross of all films released in 1959.

Controversy
Shammi Kapoor received a legal notice from director Abbas when he refused to act for one of the songs in the film, and many other controversies with the stars of that era caused director Abbas to vow to stop making movies with mainstream movie stars.

Notes

References

External links
 

1959 films
1950s Hindi-language films
Films based on Indian novels
Indian black-and-white films
Films directed by K. A. Abbas
Films scored by Anil Biswas
Films with screenplays by Khwaja Ahmad Abbas